Uga-Uga is a Brazilian telenovela produced and aired by TV Globo from 8 May 2000 to 19 January 2001 for 221 episodes. It is written by Carlos Lombardi, with the collaboration of Margareth Boury and Tiago Santiago.

Cast 
 Humberto Martins as Bernardo Baldochi / Bento (Kala Kalú)
 Vivianne Pasmanter as Maria João Portela
 Cláudio Heinrich as Adriano Karabastos (Tatu)
 Vera Holtz as Santa Karabastos
 Lima Duarte as Nikos Karabastos
 Danielle Winits as Tati (Tatiana Prado)
 Marcello Novaes as Beterraba
 Mariana Ximenes as Bionda Arruda Prado
 Marcos Pasquim as Casemiro Baldochi (Van Damme)
 Lúcia Veríssimo as Maria Louca
 Sílvia Pfeifer as Vitória Arruda Prado
 Heitor Martinez as Rolando Karabastos
 Tato Gabus Mendes as Anísio Karabastos
 Wolf Maya as Felipe Prado
 Nair Bello as Pierina Baldochi
 Marcos Frota as Nikolaos Karabastos Júnior (Nikos)
 Ângelo Paes Leme as Salomão
 Françoise Forton as Larissa Guerra
 Oswaldo Loureiro as Querubim
 Roberto Bonfim as Pajé
 Nívea Stelmann as Gui (Guinivere)
 Rita Guedes as Stella
 Joana Limaverde as Bruna
 Matheus Rocha as Ari
 Juliana Baroni as Shiva Maria Pomeranz
 Geórgia Gomide as Gherda
 Luiz Guilherme as Turco
 Alexandre Lemos as Dinho
 Delano Avelar as Argel
 Vanessa Nunes as Penélope
 Alexandre Schumacher as Zen
 Vick Militello as Dominatrix
 Tatyane Goulart as Lilith Pomeranz
 Beth Lamas as Madá
 Hugo Gross as Barbosa
 Mônica Mattos as Tânia

Guest stars 
 Betty Lago as Brigitte/ Alice
 Lúcia Veríssimo as Maria Louca
 Mário Gomes as Ladislau Pomeranz
 John Herbert as Veludo
 Stepan Nercessian as João Guerra Portella
 Jorge Pontual as Mutuca
 Marcelo Faria as Ramon
 Maria Ceiça as Rosa
 Denise Fraga as Mag
 Luiz Fernando Guimarães as Varella
 João Carlos Barroso as Pereirinha
 Luciano Szafir as Pepê
 Edwin Luisi as Francis
 Cássia Linhares as Lulú
 Nelson Freitas as Nilo
 Clarice Niskier as Amélia
 Bianca Castanho as Ametista
 Silvia Nobre as Crocoká
 Taís Araújo as Emilinha
 Cláudia Lira as Suzi
 Norma Geraldy as Norma
 Oswaldo Louzada as Dr Moretti
 Lolita Rodrigues as Carmen
 Gabriel Braga Nunes as Otacílio
 Paula Burlamaqui as Kate
 Elias Gleizer as Ceguinho
 Isadora Ribeiro as Marlene
 Ewerton de Castro as Marido nervoso
 Daniele Suzuki as Sarah
 Marcos Breda as Gumercindo
 Betty Erthal as Violeta
 Sokram Sommar as Índio Tupã
 Sérgio Loroza as Pimpão
 George Bezerra as Zeca
 Osvaldo Mil as Geraldão
 João Camargo as Padre Zeca
 Moacir Alves as Antiquário
 Fernanda Lobo as Gorda na lanchonete
 Alexandre Zacchia as Jambo
 Berta Loran as Varella's passenger on the plane
 Miriam Pires as Cecília
 Marcela Rafea as Dóris
 Junior Prata as Pescador

References

External links 
 Uga-Uga at Memoria Globo 
 

2000 telenovelas
Brazilian telenovelas
TV Globo telenovelas
2000 Brazilian television series debuts
2001 Brazilian television series endings
Portuguese-language telenovelas